Cehu Silvaniei (until 1854 , meaning "Czechs of Szilágy") is a town in Sălaj County, Crișana, Romania. Four villages are administered by the town: Horoatu Cehului (Oláhhorvát), Motiș (Mutos), Nadiș (Szilágynádasd) and Ulciug (Völcsök).

History of the town
The first written mention of the town dates from 1319 under the name Cheevar. In 1405, the city was mentioned under the name Chehy. The Hungarian name of the city referred to a stand of Czech origin.

The town was until 1918 part of the Kingdom of Hungary and specifically of the Principality of Transylvania. In 1529, the voivod István Báthory granted the city the right to govern itself.

After the dissolution of the principality of Transylvania in 1867 and its direct integration into the Austro-Hungarian Empire as part of Hungary (see the Austro-Hungarian Compromise of 1867), the city is attached to Szilágy County in 1876. In 1918, during the disintegration of the empire at the end of World War I, the city became part of the Kingdom of Romania.

From 1940 to 1944 it was annexed by Hungary as a result of the Second Vienna Award. In May 1944, its Jewish community was exterminated by the Nazis during several deportations to Auschwitz.

At the end of World War II, the city was incorporated into Romania again.

The city has long been an agricultural center. In 1968, during the country's administrative reorganization, it acquired city status and then industrialization take place (textiles, furniture).

Climate
Cehu Silvaniei has a humid continental climate (Cfb in the Köppen climate classification).

Demographics

At the 2011 census, 50.4% of inhabitants were Hungarians, 44.5% Romanians and 4.9% Roma. At the same census, 47% were Romanian Orthodox, 44.4% Reformed, 3.5% Roman Catholic, 2.4% belonged to "another religion" and 1% Baptist.

Historic sites and monuments

Hungarian Reformed Church of Cehu-Silvaniei - national monument 
Probably members of two families, Miklós Drágffy and his wife, and Eufémia Jakcs or their son, Bertalan, later voivod of Transylvania (1493–98) built the church somewhere in the middle of the second half of the 15th century. Governor Drágffy János (1525–26) was an important patron of the church: he made some changes on the church in 1519, and had a lombard-patterned renaissance sedile made for it in 1522.

In 1614, due to the generosity of Prépostváry Zsigmond and his wife Széchy Katalin, the rules of the market-town then, the tower at the western façade is built, as shown by the escutcheoned memorial tablet on its southern wall.
The medieval nave is enlarged in 1801, and then 1905, with square side-aisles and the interior gets a classicist proportions.
This church is a national monument classified with number SJ-II-m-A-05034.

Jewish cemetery

The 1850 Jewish population by census was 63, in 1857 was 66, in 1880 was 206, in 1900 was 369, in 1910 was 517, and in 1930 was 551. In May 1944, the Jews were gathered in the ghetto that the Nazis and their collaborators set up near Cehu Silvaniei (the Cehei ghetto, outside Șimleu Silvaniei), and on May 31 and June 6, 8 they were deported to Auschwitz. The unlandmarked Orthodox cemetery was established in the 19th century. The last known burial was in the 20th century.

The isolated suburban flat land has no sign or marker. Reached via private road, access is open with permission. A fence with a gate that locks surrounds the site. Approximate 1-20 stones are visible, some not in original location with 25%-50% of the stones being toppled or broken. The location of the stones that have been removed from the cemetery is unknown. Vegetation overgrowth in the cemetery is a seasonal problem preventing access. Water drainage is good all year. There are no special sections.

The oldest known gravestone dates from the 19th century. The 19th and 20th century marble, granite, sandstone, and limestone boulders, flat and shaped, smoothed and inscribed, carved relief decorated gravestones have Hebrew inscriptions. Some have traces of painting on their surfaces. No known mass graves. The national Jewish community owns the property used for Jewish cemetery only. Adjacent properties are residential. The cemetery maintenance worked on the re-erection of stones, patching broken stones, cleaning stones, and clearing vegetation. Current care involves occasional clearing or cleaning of the cemetery by unpaid individuals. There are no structures.

Natives
 Alexandru Koller
 Agi Mishol

References

External links

 Map of the Sălaj county

 
Populated places in Sălaj County
Localities in Crișana
Towns in Romania
Shtetls
Czech communities in Romania
Croatian communities
Holocaust locations in Hungary